Albert "Al" Cosad White (May 14, 1895 – July 8, 1982) was an American diver who competed in the 1924 Summer Olympics. He competed collegiately for Stanford University, and was also the captain of Stanford's gymnastics team, which won the Pacific Coast Conference championship in 1921.

In 1924 he won the gold medal in the 3 m springboard competition as well as in the 10 metre platform event.

See also
 List of members of the International Swimming Hall of Fame

References

External links 
profile

1895 births
1982 deaths
Divers at the 1924 Summer Olympics
Olympic gold medalists for the United States in diving
Stanford Cardinal men's divers
American male divers
Medalists at the 1924 Summer Olympics
Stanford Cardinal men's gymnasts